Entropy is a 1999 film directed by Phil Joanou, starring Stephen Dorff and featuring the Irish rock band U2.

Plot
A largely autobiographical film about director Phil Joanou, covering his early film career, his relationships, including a very short-lived marriage.

Release
The film has been re-released as "Adventures in Tinseltown" for streaming and is available on Tubi and Amazon Prime Video.

References

External links

1999 films
1999 drama films
American drama films
Films scored by George Fenton
Films about film directors and producers
Films directed by Phil Joanou
Warner Bros. films
American independent films
Films produced by Elie Samaha
1999 independent films
1990s English-language films
1990s American films
English-language drama films